The R478 road is a regional road in Ireland. It is a loop road from the N67 in County Clare. Part of the road is on the Wild Atlantic Way. The road passes along, and is the only road access to, the Cliffs of Moher.

The R478 travels west from the R476 near Lisdoonvarna. After passing the Cliffs of Moher and Liscannor, the road rejoins the N67 in Lahinch.

References

Regional roads in the Republic of Ireland
Roads in County Clare